William "Bill" M. Wolf (September 24, 1935) is a former member of the Kansas House of Representatives, who represented the 112th district from 2007 to 2013.

Committee membership
 Commerce and Labor
 Transportation
 Agriculture and Natural Resources

Major donors
The top 5 donors to Wolf's 2008 campaign:
1. Koch Industries 	$1,000 
2. Kansas Medical Society 	$1,000 	
3. Kansas Bankers Assoc 	$1,000 	
4. Kansas Republican Party 	$1,000 	
5. Prairie Band Potawatomi Nation 	$1,000

References

External links
 Kansas Legislature - William Wolf
 Project Vote Smart profile
 Kansas Votes profile
 State Surge - Legislative and voting track record
 Campaign contributions: 2008

Republican Party members of the Kansas House of Representatives
Living people
1935 births
21st-century American politicians